Mr. Sandy is the name of a chain of fast-food restaurants, first opened in the United States in 1984.  The name of the chain is a reference to the nickname given to the head of the Weaver family by his friends and neighbors.

The family-owned business has 48 outlets, with approximately three outlets for each adult family member.  The total number of points open to franchise is more than 1500.

Mr. Sandy operates in street trade to take away. The standard menu includes pizza, sandwiches, hot dogs, baguettes with stuffing, pancakes, french fries, oxygen cocktails, etc.  There are 180 stores in food courts, and only 62 individual enterprises such as restaurants.  The basic emphasis is placed on a single-format outlet with a single product trade.

In 2009, color rectangles were added to the company logo to refer to its markets in other countries, including the Czech Republic, Russia, Ukraine, France, Greece, etc.  Outlets were opened in the Czech Republic and France in 2009, and will be opened in Russia and Ukraine in 2010.

Countries with Mr. Sandy restaurants 

 United States
 France
 Czech Republic
 Greece
 Russia
 Ukraine
 Kazakhstan

External links 
 Mr. Sandy
 Mr. Sandy in Russia

Fast-food chains of the United States
Fast-food franchises